Ratul Puri is the Chairman of the Board of Directors of Hindustan Powerprojects.

Biography 
Ratul is an alumnus of Carnegie Mellon University, the Pittsburgh-based global research university with a bachelor's degree in computer engineering, mathematics, and computer science.

Ratul in 2008 started the business of power generation with Hindustan Powerprojects. Puri is the nephew of Congress party politician and former Madhya Pradesh Chief Minister Kamal Nath.

Recognition 

In 2002, Puri was the Ernst & Young "Entrepreneur of the Year" award for his contribution towards manufacturing industry in India. He is part of the many think tanks that are evolving solutions to usher energy sufficiency in India and was part of the World Economic Forum as one of the Young Global leaders.  In 2007, Business Today rated him among the "Top 21 Young Leaders" in the country who could shape India’s destiny in the 21st century. Dataquest magazine has named him amongst the "Young Brigade in the IT Industry".
He was declared CMO Asia CEO of the Year award. In 2014, Ratul Puri was recognized as the ‘CEO of the year’ by World Brand Congress and acknowledged for his contribution to the infrastructure sector by ET Infrastructure.

In News 
In November 2019, the Enforcement Directorate filed a charge sheet against Puri and his company Moser Baer for money laundering and bank fraud in the Agusta Westland chopper scam.

References

External links
Exempt power producers from payment of MAT, ""Economic Times"" 7 July 2014
Personal Blog Website

Living people
Indian business executives
1972 births